Regina Scheer (born in 1950) is a German writer and historian.

Professional career 
Born in East-Berlin, Scheer studied theatre and cultural studies from 1968 to 1973 at the Humboldt-Universität zu Berlin. She was a copywriter at Oktoberklub From 1972 to 1976, she worked as editor of the Freie Deutsche Jugend' student newspaper Forum, and from 1980 to 1990 at the literary magazine . Since the Peaceful Revolution, she has worked as a freelance journalist, historian and editor.

Scheer published several books on German-Jewish history and had her first novel  published in 2014.

Awards 
 2014:  
 2017:

Publications 
 AHAWAH, das vergessene Haus. Aufbau, Berlin 1992
 Es gingen Wasser wild über unsere Seele. Aufbau, Berlin 1999
 Der Umgang mit den Denkmälern. , Potsdam 2003
 Im Schatten der Sterne. Aufbau, Berlin 2004
 Wir sind die Liebermanns. Propyläen, Berlin 2006
 Mausche mi-Dessau Moses Mendelssohn. Hentrich & Hentrich, Teetz 2006
 Den Schwächeren helfen, stark zu sein. Die  im Berliner Wedding 1882–2007. Hentrich & Hentrich, Teetz 2007, 
 Kurt Tucholsky. Hentrich & Hentrich, Teetz 2008
 Zerbrochene Bilder. , Rheinsberg 2011
 Zerstörte Kindheit und Jugend.
 Machandel.
 After Auschwitz: The Difficult Legacies of the GDR. 2021.

References

External links 
 
 

1950 births
21st-century German women writers
21st-century German historians
Living people